Stichopus monotuberculatus is a species of sea cucumber in the family Stichopodidae. It is found in the tropical, western Indo-Pacific Ocean.

References

Stichopodidae
Animals described in 1834